Hong Ra-hee (born 15 July 1945) is a South Korean billionaire businesswoman who is the director of Leeum, Samsung Museum of Art. She is the widow of Lee Kun-hee, who was the richest person in South Korea. She is known as the most powerful art collector in South Korea.

Career 
Hong graduated from Seoul National University. She majored in Applied Arts. She is the co-founder of Leeum, Samsung Museum of Art, which she has built with her husband in 2004. Hong's collection includes Lee Ufan, Do-ho Suh, Whanki Kim, Jackson Pollock, Mark Rothko, and Andy Warhol.

Hong began her career at JoongAng Ilbo Publishing from 1975 to 1980.

She served as a Chairperson of Samsung Arts and Cultural Foundation since 1995.

Family
Her daughters are joint presidents of Samsung C&T Corporation, while her daughter Lee Seo-hyun oversees Samsung's fashion division, and her other daughter Lee Boo-jin oversees the resort division, which included the Everland Resort. Her father Hong Jin-ki was chairman of JoongAng Ilbo, and also an identified Chinilpa. Her brother Hong Seok-hyun is the ex-CEO of JoongAng Media Group. It is now run by Hong Jeongdo, Hong's nephew.

Her ex-daughter-in-law was Lim Se-ryung, the daughter of Daesang Group's chairman Lim Chang-Wook. Lim was married to Hong's son Lee Jae-yong in 1998 and divorced in 2009.

References

South Korean billionaires
Samsung people
Living people
1944 births
Female billionaires
Lee family (South Korea)
Seoul National University alumni